2004 in Ghana details events of note that happened in Ghana in the year 2004.

Incumbents
 President: John Kufuor
 Vice President: Aliu Mahama
 Chief Justice: George Kingsley Acquah

Events

January

February

March
6 March - 47th independence anniversary
18 March - President John Kufuor launches National Health Insurance Scheme.

April

May

June

July

August

September
September 2 - Women's Manifesto for Ghana issued in Accra

October

November

December
3rd - West African Gas Pipeline Project commissioned by President John Kufour.
7th - Presidential and Parliamentary Elections held.
9th - John Kufour declared winner of the Presidential elections.

National holidays
Holidays in italics are "special days", while those in regular type are "regular holidays".
 January 1: New Year's Day
 March 6: Independence Day
 May 1: Labor Day
 December 25: Christmas
 December 26: Boxing Day

In addition, several other places observe local holidays, such as the foundation of their town. These are also "special days."

References

 
Ghana